Charles William Eliot (March 20, 1834 – August 22, 1926) was an American academic who was president of Harvard University from 1869 to 1909, the longest term of any Harvard president. A member of the prominent Eliot family of Boston, he transformed Harvard from a respected provincial college into America's preeminent research university.
Theodore Roosevelt called him "the only man in the world I envy."

Early life and education
Charles Eliot was a scion of the wealthy Eliot family of Boston. He was the son of politician Samuel Atkins Eliot and his wife Mary (née Lyman), and was the grandchild of banker Samuel Eliot and merchant Theodore Lyman of the Lyman Estate. He was one of five siblings and the only boy. Eliot graduated from Boston Latin School in 1849 and from Harvard University in 1853. He was later made an honorary member of the Hasty Pudding.

Although he had high expectations and obvious scientific talents, the first fifteen years of Eliot's career were less than auspicious.  He was appointed Tutor in Mathematics at Harvard in the fall of 1854, and studied chemistry with Josiah P. Cooke. In 1858, he was promoted to Assistant Professor of Mathematics and Chemistry.  He taught competently, wrote some technical pieces on chemical impurities in industrial metals, and busied himself with schemes for the reform of Harvard's Lawrence Scientific School.

But his real goal, appointment to the Rumford Professorship of Chemistry, eluded him.  This was a particularly bitter blow because of a change in his family's economic circumstances—the financial failure of his father, Samuel Atkins Eliot, in the Panic of 1857.  Eliot had to face the fact that "he had nothing to look to but his teacher's salary and a legacy left to him by his grandfather Lyman."  After a bitter struggle over the Rumford chair, Eliot left Harvard in 1863.  His friends assumed that he would "be obliged to cut chemistry and go into business in order to earn a livelihood for his family." But instead, he used his grandfather's large legacy and a small borrowed sum to spend the next two years studying the educational systems of the Old World in Europe.

Studies of European education
Eliot's approach to investigating European education was unusual. He did not confine his attention to educational institutions, but explored the role of education in every aspect of national life. When Eliot visited schools, he took an interest in every aspect of institutional operation, from curriculum and methods of instruction through physical arrangements and custodial services. But his particular concern was with the relation between education and economic growth:

                                                           
Eliot understood the interdependence of education and enterprise. In a letter to his cousin Arthur T. Lyman, he discussed the value to the German chemical industry of discoveries made in university laboratories. He also recognized that, while European universities depended on government for support, American institutions would have to draw on the resources of the wealthy. He wrote to his cousin:

While Eliot was in Europe, he was again presented with the opportunity to enter the world of active business. The Merrimack Company, one of the largest textile mills in the United States, tendered him an invitation to become its superintendent. In spite of the urgings of his friends and the attractiveness of what for the time was the enormous salary of $5000 (plus a good house, rent free), Eliot, after giving considerable thought to the offer, turned it down. One of his biographers speculated that he surely realized by this time that he had a strong taste for organizing and administration. This post would have given it scope. He must have felt, even if dimly, that if science interested him, it was not because he was first and last a lover of her laws and generalizations, not only because the clarity and precision of science was congenial, but because science answered the questions of practical men and conferred knowledge and power upon those who would perform the labors of their generation.

During nearly two years in Europe he had found himself as much fascinated by what he could learn concerning the methods by which science could be made to help industry as by what he discovered about the organization  of institutions of learning. He was thinking much about what his own young country needed, and his hopes for the United States took account of industry and commerce as well as the field of academic endeavor. To be the chief executive officer of a particular business offered only a limited range of influence; but to stand at the intersection of the realm of production and the realm of knowledge offered considerably more.

Crisis in American colleges 
In the 1800s, American colleges, controlled by clergymen, continued to embrace classical curricula that had little relevance to an industrializing nation. Few offered courses in the sciences, modern languages, history, or political economy — and only a handful had graduate or professional schools.

As businessmen became increasingly reluctant to send their sons to schools whose curricula offered nothing useful — or to donate money for their support, some educational leaders began exploring ways of making higher education more attractive. Some backed the establishment of specialized schools of science and technology, like Harvard's Lawrence Scientific School, Yale's Sheffield Scientific School, and the newly chartered Massachusetts Institute of Technology, about to offer its first classes in 1865. Others proposed abandoning the classical curriculum, in favor of more vocational offerings.

Harvard was in the middle of this crisis. After three undistinguished short-term clerical Harvard presidencies in a ten-year period, Boston's business leaders, many of them Harvard alumni, were pressing for change — though with no clear idea of the kinds of changes they wanted.

On his return to the United States in 1865, Eliot accepted an appointment as Professor of Analytical Chemistry at the newly founded Massachusetts Institute of Technology. In that year, an important revolution occurred in the government of Harvard University.  The board of overseers had hitherto consisted of the governor, lieutenant-governor, president of the state senate, speaker of the house, secretary of the board of education, and president and treasurer of the university, together with thirty other persons, and these other persons were elected by joint ballot of the two houses of the state legislature.

An opinion had long been gaining ground that it would be better for the community and the interests of learning, as well as for the university, if the power to elect the overseers were transferred from the legislature to the graduates of the college. This change was made in 1865, and at the same time the governor and other state officers ceased to form part of the board. The effect of this change was to greatly strengthen the interest of the alumni in the management of the university, and thus to prepare the way for extensive and thorough reforms. Shortly afterward Dr. Thomas Hill resigned the presidency, and after a considerable interregnum Eliot succeeded to that office in 1869.

Harvard presidency
Early in 1869, Eliot had presented his ideas about reforming American higher education in a compelling two-part article, "The New Education," in The Atlantic Monthly, the nation's leading journal of opinion. "We are fighting a wilderness, physical and moral," Eliot declared in setting forth his vision of the American university, "for this fight we must be trained and armed." The articles resonated powerfully with the businessmen who controlled the Harvard Corporation. Shortly after their appearance, merely 35 years old, he was elected as the youngest president in the history of the nation's oldest university.

Eliot's educational vision incorporated important elements of Unitarian and Emersonian ideas about character development, framed by a pragmatic understanding of the role of higher education in economic and political leadership. His concern in "The New Education" was not merely curriculum, but the ultimate utility of education. A college education could enable a student to make intelligent choices, but should not attempt to provide specialized vocational or technical training.

Although his methods were pragmatic, Eliot's ultimate goal, like those of the secularized Puritanism of the Boston elite, was a spiritual one. The spiritual desideratum was not otherworldly. It was embedded in the material world and consisted of measurable progress of the human spirit towards mastery of human intelligence over nature — the "moral and spiritual wilderness."  While this mastery depended on each individual fully realizing his capacities, it was ultimately a collective achievement and the product of institutions which established the conditions both for individual  and collective achievement. Like the Union victory in the Civil War, triumph over the moral and physical wilderness and the establishment of mastery required a joining of industrial and cultural forces.

While he proposed the reform of professional schools, the development of research faculties, and, in general, a huge broadening of the curriculum, his blueprint for undergraduate education in crucial ways preserved — and even enhanced — its traditional spiritual and character education functions. Echoing Emerson, he believed that every individual mind had "its own peculiar constitution." The problem, both in terms of fully developing an individual's capacities and in maximizing his social utility, was to present him with a course of study sufficiently representative so as "to reveal to him, or at least to his teachers and parents, his capacities and tastes." An informed choice once made, the individual might pursue whatever specialized branch of knowledge he found congenial.

But Eliot's goal went well beyond Emersonian self-actualization for its own sake. Framed by the higher purposes of a research university in the service of the nation, specialized expertise could be harnessed to public purposes. "When the revelation of his own peculiar taste and capacity comes to a young man, let him reverently give it welcome, thank God, and take courage," Eliot declared in his inaugural address. He further stated:

On the subject of educational reform, he declared:

Under Eliot's leadership, Harvard adopted an "elective system" which vastly expanded the range of courses offered and permitted undergraduates unrestricted choice in selecting their courses of study — with a view to enabling them to discover their "natural bents" and pursue them into specialized studies. A monumental expansion of Harvard's graduate and professional school and departments facilitated specialization, while at the same time making the university a center for advanced scientific and technological research. Accompanying this was a shift in pedagogy from recitations and lectures towards classes that put students' achievements to the test and, through a revised grading system, rigorously assessed individual performance.

Eliot's reforms did not go without major criticism. His own kinsman Samuel Eliot Morison in his tercentenary history of Harvard made this devastating assessment:

Opposition to football and other sports 
During his tenure, Eliot opposed football and tried unsuccessfully to abolish the game at Harvard. In 1905, The New York Times reported that he called it "a fight whose strategy and ethics are those of war", that violation of rules cannot be prevented, that "the weaker man is considered the legitimate prey of the stronger" and that "no sport is wholesome in which ungenerous or mean acts which easily escape detection contribute to victory."

He also made public objections to baseball, basketball, and hockey.  He was quoted as saying that rowing and tennis were the only clean sports.

Eliot once said:

Attempted acquisition of MIT
During his lengthy tenure as Harvard's leader, Eliot initiated repeated attempts to acquire his former employer, the fledgling Massachusetts Institute of Technology, and these efforts continued even after he stepped down from the presidency.  The much younger college had considerable financial problems during its first five decades, and had been repeatedly rescued from insolvency by various benefactors, including George Eastman, the founder of Eastman Kodak Company.  The faculty, students, and alumni of MIT often vehemently opposed merger of their school under the Harvard umbrella.  In 1916, MIT succeeded in moving across the Charles River from crowded Back Bay, Boston to larger facilities on the southern riverfront of Cambridge, but still faced the prospect of merger with Harvard,
which was to begin "when the Institute will occupy its splendid new buildings in Cambridge."  However, in 1917, the Massachusetts Supreme Judicial Court rendered a decision that effectively cancelled plans for a merger, and MIT eventually attained independent financial stability. During his life, Eliot had been involved in at least five unsuccessful attempts to absorb MIT into Harvard.

Personal life
On October 27, 1858, Eliot married Ellen Derby Peabody of Salem Massachusetts (1836–1869) in Boston at Kings Chapel. Ellen was the daughter of Ephraim Peabody (1807-1856) and Mary Jane Derby (1807-1892), great-great-granddaughter of Elias Hasket Derby (1739-1799), and the sister of architect Robert Swain Peabody. They had four sons, one of whom, Charles Eliot (November 1, 1859 – March 25, 1897) became an important landscape architect, responsible for Boston's public park system. Another son, Samuel Atkins Eliot II (August 24, 1862 – October 15, 1950) became a Unitarian minister who was the longest-serving president of the American Unitarian Association (1900–1927) and was the first president granted executive authority of that organization.

The Nobel Prize-winning poet T.S. Eliot was a cousin and attended Harvard from 1906 through 1909, completing his elective undergraduate courses in three instead of the normal four years, which were the last three years of Charles' presidency.

After Ellen Derby Peabody died at the age of 33 of tuberculosis, Eliot married a second wife in 1877, Grace Mellen Hopkinson (1846–1924). This second marriage did not produce any children. Grace was a close relative of Frances Stone Hopkinson, wife of Samuel Atkins Eliot II, Charles's son.

Eliot retired in 1909, having served 40 years as president, the longest term in the university's history, and was honored as Harvard's first president emeritus. He lived another 17 years, dying in Northeast Harbor, Maine, in 1926, and was interred in Mount Auburn Cemetery in Cambridge, Massachusetts.

Legacy 
Under Eliot, Harvard became a worldwide university, accepting its students around America using standardized entrance examinations and hiring well-known scholars from home and abroad. Eliot was an administrative reformer, reorganizing the university's faculty into schools and departments and replacing recitations with lectures and seminars. During his forty-year presidency, the university vastly expanded its facilities, with laboratories, libraries, classrooms, and athletic facilities replacing simple colonial structures. Eliot attracted the support of major donors from among the nation's growing plutocracy, making it the wealthiest private university in the world.

Eliot's leadership made Harvard not only the pace-setter for other American schools, but a major figure in the reform of secondary school education. Both the elite boarding schools, most of them founded during his presidency, and the public high schools shaped their curricula to meet Harvard's demanding standards. Eliot was a key figure in the creation of standardized admissions examinations, as a founding member of the College Entrance Examination Board.

As leader of the nation's wealthiest and best-known university, Eliot was necessarily a celebrated figure whose opinions were sought on a wide variety of matters, from tax policy (he offered the first coherent rationale for the charitable tax exemption) to the intellectual welfare of the general public.

President Eliot edited the Harvard Classics, which together are colloquially known as his Five Foot Shelf and which were intended at the time to suggest a foundation for informed discourse, "A good substitute for a liberal education in youth to anyone who would read them with devotion, even if he could spare but fifteen minutes a day for reading."

Eliot was an articulate opponent of American imperialism, and he was opposed to the education of women. Many talented African Americans were educated at Harvard during Eliot's tenure, including such notables as W. E. B. Du Bois (Class of 1890). Booker T. Washington was awarded an honorary degree by Harvard in 1896. Unlike his successor, A. Lawrence Lowell, Eliot opposed efforts to limit the admission of Jews and Roman Catholics. At the same time, Eliot was radically opposed to labor unions, fostering a campus climate where many Harvard students served as strikebreakers; he was called by some "the greatest labor union hater in the country."

Charles Eliot was a fearless crusader not only for educational reform, but for many of the goals of the progressive movement—whose most prominent figurehead was Theodore Roosevelt (Class of 1880) and most eloquent spokesman was Herbert Croly (Class of 1889).

Eliot was also involved in philanthropy. In 1908 he joined the General Education Board, in 1913 served on the International Health Board, and served as a trustee of the Rockefeller Foundation from 1914 to 1917. Helped found the Institute for Government Research (Brookings Institution) and serving as trustee. Acted as a founding trustee of the Carnegie Endowment for International Peace from its beginning in 1910 until 1919. Was an incorporator of the Boston Museum of Fine Arts in 1870, and a trustee. Between 1908 and 1925 he served as the chairman of the Museum's Special Advisory Committee on Education. Served as vice president for the National Committee for Mental Hygiene from 1913 till his death. Accepted election to be the first president of the American Social Hygiene Association. In 1902 became vice president of the National Civil Service Reform League, and in 1908 president of the league.

In celebration of President Eliot's 90 birthday, congratulations came in across the world and notably from two American Presidents.  Woodrow Wilson said of him, “No man has ever made a deeper impression of the educational system of a country than President Eliot has upon the educational system of America,” while Theodore Roosevelt exclaimed, “He is the only man in the world I envy.” 

Upon his death in 1926, The New York Times published a full-page interview that Eliot had given as he neared the end of his life, including excerpts from his writings on education, religion, democracy, labor, woman, and Americanism.

Inscriptions composed by Charles W. Eliot
Over one hundred inscriptions were composed by President Eliot, placed on buildings ranging from schools, churches, public buildings, memorial tablets, numerous monuments, and to the Library of Congress.

ON THESE HEIGHTS 
DURING THE NIGHT OF MARCH 4 1776,
THE AMERICAN TROOPS BESIEGING BOSTON
BUILT TWO REDOUBTS, 
WHICH MADE THE HARBOR AND TOWN 
UNTENABLE BY THE BRITISH FLEET AND GARRISON.
ON MARCH 17 THE BRITISH FLEET
CARRYING 11000 EFFECTIVE MEN
AND 1000 REFUGES,
DROPPED DOWN TO NANTASKET ROADS
AND THENCEFORTH
BOSTON WAS FREE,
A STRONG BRITISH FORCE
HAD BEEN EXPELLED 
FROM ONE OF THE UNITED AMERICAN COLONIES
(Evacuation Monument - Dorchester Heights Monument, Boston, Massachusetts, 1902)

TO THE MEN OF BOSTON
WHO DIED FOR THEIR COUNTRY
ON LAND AND SEA IN THE WAR
WHICH KEPT THE UNION WHOLE,
DESTROYED SLAVERY AND MAINTAINED THE CONSTITUTION.
THE GRATEFUL CITY
HAS BUILT THIS MONUMENT,
THAT THEIR EXAMPLE MAY SPEAK 
TO COMING GENERATIONS
(Soldiers and Sailors Monument (Boston), Boston Common, Massachusetts, 1877)

Monuments and memorials

Eliot House, one of the seven original residential houses for undergraduates at the college, was named in honor of Eliot and opened in 1931. Charles W. Eliot Middle School in Altadena, California, Eliot Elementary School in Tulsa, Oklahoma, Charles William Eliot Junior High School (now Eliot-Hine Middle School) in Washington, DC were named in his honor. In 1940 the United States Postal Service issued a stamp in Eliot's honor as part of their Famous Americans Issue. Asteroid (5202) Charleseliot is named in his honor. 
 Eliot Mountain was named in honor of the lifelong academic who summered on Mount Desert Island, Maine, and was a key figure in the creation of Acadia National Park.

Honors and degrees
1857 Fellow American Academy of Arts and Sciences  
1869 LL.D. Williams College; LL.D. Princeton University 
1870 LL.D. Yale University                                                       
1871 Member American Philosophical Society 
1873 Member Massachusetts Historical Society
1879 Honorary Member American Library Association
1902 LL.D. Johns Hopkins University  
1903 Officer Legion of Honor ( France)
1904 Corresponding Member Academy Moral and Political Science, Institute of France
1908 Grand Officer Order of the Crown of Italy
1909 Imperial Order of the Rising Sun, 1st class; Royal Order of Merit of the Prussian Crown, 1st class; Fellow Royal Society of Literature (England); LL.D. Tulane University; LL.D. University of Missouri; LL.D. Dartmouth College; LL.D. Harvard University; MD. (hon.) Harvard University
1911 Ph.D. (hon.) University of Breslau
1914 Corresponding Fellow of the British Academy; LL.D. Brown University
1915 Gold Medal / American Academy of Arts and Letters
1919 Order of the Crown of Belgium
1923 Grand Cordon of the Order of St. Sava, Serbia; LL.D. Boston University; Civic Forum Medal of Honor, New York
1924 Roosevelt Medal for Distinguished Service; Commander of the Legion of Honor (France); LL.D. University of the State of New York

Books

Educational Reform: Essays and Addresses (1901)
The Conflict between Individualism and Collectivism in a Democracy (1910)

See also
History of the Massachusetts Institute of Technology
Lawrence Scientific School

Notes

References 
 Hugh Hawkins. (1972). Between Harvard and America: The Educational Leadership of Charles W. Eliot. New York, NY: Oxford University Press.
 Henry James. (1930). Charles W. Eliot — President of Harvard, 1869–1909. Cambridge, MA: Houghton Mifflin.
 Samuel Eliot Morison. (1936). Three Centuries of Harvard. Cambridge, MA: Harvard University Press.
 Samuel Eliot Morison (ed.). (1930). The Development of Harvard University, 1869–1929. Cambridge, MA: Harvard University Press.
 "Football is a fight, says President Eliot. Harvard's Head Vigorously Attacks the Game. Strong Prey on the Weak. Conditions Governing the Sport Dr. Eliot Describes as Hateful & Mean; Wants $2,500,000 Endowment." The New York Times, February 2, 1905, p. 6. Quoted material is verbatim from the Times, but reported by the Times as indirect quotations from Eliot.

External links

 Brief biography, Columbia Encyclopedia, 6th Edition, 2001.
 
 
 
 Texts of some of Eliot's most important writings, along with interpretive texts
 

Presidents of Harvard University
Harvard College alumni
Rockefeller Foundation people
People from Boston
Boston Latin School alumni
1834 births
1926 deaths
Eliot family (America)
Burials at Mount Auburn Cemetery
Corresponding Fellows of the British Academy
Carnegie Endowment for International Peace
Massachusetts Institute of Technology people